The Asian Social Institute (ASI) is a graduate school and research institution in Manila, Philippines. It is one of the few graduate institutes specializing in economics, sociology, social work and social services and development in the country.

Background
Asian Social Institute (ASI), a Manila-based Graduate School of Social Transformative Praxis was established in 1962 by a Dutch Catholic Missionary of the Congregation of the Immaculate Heart of Mary (CICM), the late Rev. Fr. Francis Senden, Ph.D.

Started with the blessings of the late Rufino Cardinal Santos, D.D. of the Archdiocese of Manila, ASI's purpose was to form and train social science-based social development managers for Asia and the Pacific in order to implement the social teachings of the Church.

Since the death of its founder in 1973, ASI has provided a learning environment which is structured in two departments – Academe-Research, and Social Development. On top of these two departments is the President's Office to whom the Communication and Publication, MIS, Promotions and Public Relations, and administrative units report. The President of ASI is Dr. Mina M. Ramirez. Academe-Research is headed by the Vice President for Academe-Research and Academic Dean, Dr. Prisinia C. Arcinue. The Vice President of the Social Development Department is Prof. Dennis Batoy.

The Academe-Research integrates theory and practice, while the Social Development Department grounds the students' learning in marginal communities through ASI's Action Subsidiaries – Family Center, Urban Community Desk, Tent School, Diocesan Accompaniment, Youth Accompaniment, ASI Enterprise Center and its NGO networks. ASI's Communication and Publication activities provide for approaches to communicating ideas.

External links
 Asian Social Institute official website
 
 ASI on Google Plus

References

Graduate schools in the Philippines
Liberal arts colleges in the Philippines
Schools of social work
Educational institutions established in 1962
Universities and colleges in Manila
Research institutes in Metro Manila
Education in Malate, Manila
1962 establishments in the Philippines